Nicholas Charles Wormald  is an Australian mathematician and professor of mathematics at Monash University. He specializes in probabilistic combinatorics, graph theory, graph algorithms, Steiner trees, web graphs, mine optimization, and other areas in combinatorics.

In 1979, Wormald earned a Ph.D. in mathematics from the University of Newcastle with a dissertation entitled Some problems in the enumeration of labelled graphs.

In 2006, he won the Euler Medal from the Institute of Combinatorics and its Applications.  He has held the Canada Research Chair in Combinatorics and Optimization at the University of Waterloo.  In 2012, he was recognized with an Australian Laureate Fellowship for his achievements.  In 2017, he was elected as a Fellow of the Australian Academy of Science.

In 2018, Wormald was an invited speaker at the International Congress of Mathematicians in Rio de Janeiro.

Selected publications

References

Year of birth missing (living people)
Living people
Australian mathematicians
University of Newcastle (Australia) alumni
Academic staff of the University of Waterloo
Graph theorists
Canada Research Chairs
Fellows of the Australian Academy of Science